A votive church (votive from the Latin  'vowed sacrifice, vows') is a church that was built as a sign of thanksgiving for salvation from an emergency or with a request for the fulfillment of a specific desire, and sometimes atonement. Often, the builder has previously made a vow to have the church built in the case of the prayer heard (takeover of the construction costs). Votive churches also include so-called thanksgiving churches:

 Votive Chapel, Nattenhausen
 Votive Church, Passau
 Votive Church, Szeged
 Votivkirche, Vienna
 Basilica of Notre-Dame-des-Victoires, Paris
 Chapelle expiatoire
 Santa Maria della Salute
 Sagrada Família
 Estrela Basilica

 

de:Votivkirche